Captain Battle is a fictional hero and one of the features in Lev Gleason's Silver Streak Comics, from the period known as the "Golden Age of Comic Books". The character is a wounded World War I veteran who has devoted his life to stopping war. He was created by Carl Formes and Jack Binder.

Publication history
The character appeared in Silver Streak Comics from issue #10 (May 1941) to #21 (May 1942).

The character was popular enough to get a brief solo series, published in Summer and Fall 1941.

Captain Battle is one of the four features in the second issue of Image Comics' Next Issue Project, Silver Streak Comics #24.

Fictional character biography
Jonathan Battle was the youngest combatant in World War I, and lost his eye. Since then, Jonathan Battle uses his jetpack, called a luceflyer, and a series of fantastic inventions to prevent World War II from taking place, including a Curvoscope, which allows him to see anywhere on the Earth by following the curvature of the Earth, and Dissolvo, which breaks down nerve and bone tissue into gelatin.

In his first three-part story, Captain Battle fought an Asian wizard known as the Black Dragon, and his army of Deaglos, humans that the Dragon had transformed into angry bird-men. At the end of the story, the surviving Deaglos were changed back to human — including an orphan, Hale, who became Battle's ward and teenage sidekick.

During his run he had three sidekicks: Hale, Kane and Captain Battle, Jr. (his son, William Battle).

The villains that Captain Battle faces include Dr. Dracula, Herr Skull, Herr Death, Sir Satan, Baron Doom, and Friar Diablo.

Film
In 2013, the film Captain Battle: Legacy War was released.

References

External links
Captain Battle at the International Catalogue of Superheroes

Fictional military personnel in comics
Fictional World War I veterans
Golden Age superheroes
Male characters in film
Captain Battle
United States-themed superheroes
Image Comics superheroes
Comics characters introduced in 1941
Male superheroes